The shilling is a historical coin, and the name of a unit of modern currencies formerly used in several countries.

Currencies

 Shilling (British coin), circulating until 1990
 Shilling (English coin), a silver coin of the Kingdom of England from king Henry VII with the forerunner, the testoon
 Shilling (Irish coin), circulating until 1993
 Shilling (Australian), a coin minted 1910–1963 
 East African shilling
 Kenyan shilling
 Somali shilling
 Somaliland shilling
 Tanzanian shilling
 Ugandan shilling

People
 Beatrice Shilling (1909–1990), British aeronautical engineer and motorcyclist
 David Shilling (born 1949), British artist and designer
 Gary Shilling, American financial analyst and commentator 
 Jennifer Shilling (born 1969), American politician
 Andrew Shilling (died 1621), English East India Company commander

Other uses
 Shilling, the grading system for Scottish ale
 Shill bidding or shilling, a practice to increase interest in a product

See also
 Schilling (disambiguation)
 Austrian schilling, the former currency of Austria
 Shieling, a hut, or collection of huts, once common in wild or lonely places in the hills and mountains of Scotland and northern England
 Shiling (disambiguation)
 Skilling (currency), the Scandinavian equivalent of the shilling